Tower Hill is a station on the abandoned North Shore Branch of the Staten Island Railway, located in Tower Hill between the Port Richmond and Elm Park neighborhoods. It is one of the three best-preserved stations on the line, the other two being Port Richmond and the line's western terminus at Arlington, in Mariners Harbor.

History
The station opened on February 23, 1886. Formerly a surface station, it and the Port Richmond station one stop east were elevated onto the current concrete trestle in 1935 as part of an SIRT grade crossing elimination project, opening as an elevated station on February 25, 1937. West of the station past Nicholas Avenue, the line recedes into an open-cut. Tower Hill station closed on March 31, 1953, along with the South Beach Branch and the rest of the North Shore Branch.

Station layout

It is one of the few stations along the North Shore Branch still standing, although in ruins.

Like the nearby Port Richmond Station, the station has a concrete island platform with a metal canopy and street staircases at both ends of the platform. The westernmost exit is at Treadwell Avenue. The easternmost exit is just east of Sharpe Avenue on private property, leading to an empty lot on Grove Avenue.

References

 https://web.archive.org/web/20150108175705/http://stationreporter.net/nshore.htm
 http://gretschviking.net/GOSIRTNorthShore.htm

North Shore Branch stations
Railway stations in the United States opened in 1886
Railway stations closed in 1953
1886 establishments in New York (state)
1953 disestablishments in New York (state)